Tonnant was an 80-gun ship of the line of the French Navy.

She was the flagship of the French fleet at the Second battle of Cape Finisterre, and later took part in the Battle of Quiberon Bay, and in the American War of Independence.

She was broken up in 1780.

Construction
Constructed in Toulon between 1740 and 1744, it was armed with 80 cannons.

Involvements
It was the flagship of Louis XV's fleet, and thus served as Admiral vessel to Marquis de l'Estenduère during the Second battle of Cape Finisterre in 1747. During this naval battle, eight French vessels were sacrificed when they took on the fourteen British ships by Admiral Hawke, to protect the merchant ships. The Tonnant was involved in fierce combat. Partly dismasted, it escaped by being towed by the Intrépide of Vaudreuil, who crossed British lines to secure the ship.

The Tonnant also participated at the Battle of Quiberon Bay in 1759; on board was the Chevalier de Bauffremont. It escaped and took refuge at Rochefort.

It was refurbished in 1770, and participated in the campaign of Admiral Estaing in America in 1778–1779. It was present during the attack on Newport in 1778 and at the Battle of Grenada on 6 July 1779. It finished its naval career in 1780.

See also
 List of ships of the line of France

References

External links
 
 

1743 ships
Ships of the line of the French Navy